Gaidai may refer to:

 Gaidai (surname)
 Kansai Gaidai University in Japan.
Kansai Gaidai College
 Kyoto Gaidai Nishi High School
 8451 Gaidai, an asteroid

See also